William Frederick Holmes (26 January 1890 – 11 October 1942) was an Australian rules footballer who played with Collingwood and Fitzroy in the Victorian Football League (VFL).

Notes

External links 

Billy Holmes's profile at Collingwood Forever

1890 births
1942 deaths
Australian rules footballers from Victoria (Australia)
Australian Rules footballers: place kick exponents
Collingwood Football Club players
Fitzroy Football Club players